Ma'di (pronounced ) is a Central Sudanic language found in Uganda and South Sudan. It is one of the Moru–Madi languages. The Madi people refer to their language as Ma'di ti, literally "Ma'di mouth".

The Ma'di people are found in Magwi County in South Sudan, and in Adjumani and Moyo districts in Uganda. Their population is about 390,000 (90,000 in South Sudan).

Ma'di is mutually intelligible with Olu'bo, Lugbara, Moru, Avokaya, Kaliko and Logo, all of which are also Moru–Madi languages.

Sociolinguistics 
Most Ma'di people are bilingual. In Uganda, the educated class speaks English as the second language and some also speak Swahili. In South Sudan, the educated Ma'dis speak English and/or Arabic. The South Sudanese Ma'di also speak Juba Arabic, spoken in South Sudan and not understood in the North. The form of Juba Arabic spoken by the Ma'di is influenced by the Nubi language spoken in Uganda among Muslims who are mainly descendants of Gordon's troops. Loanwords in Ugandan Ma'di are therefore mainly of English and/or Swahili origin and in Sudanese Ma'di of English and/or Juba Arabic origin.

There is an interesting linguistic interaction between the Ma'di, the Acholi and the Kuku. Most Ma'dis speak Acholi but hardly any Acholi speak Ma'di. This is possibly because during the first civil war in the Sudan, most Sudanese Ma'di were settled among the Acholi in Uganda. Possibly for the same reasons, most Kukus speak fluent Ugandan Ma'di, but hardly any Ma'di speak Kuku. It is still possible even today to find among the Sudanese Ma'di people who can trace their ancestry to the neighbouring tribes – Bari, Kuku, Pajulu, Acholi, etc. Hardly any of them can now speak their 'ancestral' languages; they speak Ma'di only and have become fully absorbed into the Ma'di community.

Crazzolara claims that there are linguistic traces of Ma'di found in Nilotic languages like Dinka (especially Atwot), Nuer and Lwo (Acholi, Alur and Lango) and among the Bantu (Nyoro and Ganda). There are also some claims which maintain that there are Acholi speaking clans in Pakele in Adjumani (in Adjumani District), whose Ma'di accent is said to be completely different from that of the other Ma'di in the area. In Adjumani itself, the Oyuwi (ojuwt) clans are said to speak three languages: Ma'di, Kakwa and Lugbara.

Phonology 

Ma'di is a tonal language, which means that meanings of words depend on the pitch. There are three tone levels (high, mid and low). The language has a number of implosives:  ('b),  ('d),  ('j),  ('gb). There are a number of secondarily and doubly articulated sounds in addition to the singularly articulated sounds. The language also has glottal stops, which can be found word medially and initially. There are ten vowels in the language, divided into +ATR  and -ATR .

Orthography
Currently there are two systems used in writing Ma'di, categorised as the old and the new system. The old system completely ignores tones, making reading more difficult. The old system also uses only five vowels (a, e, i, o, u).
The new systems employs ten vowels (see the tables on the previous section). It also identifies four tones: high (close), mid, low and falling.

Examples:
 pắ - leg [high tone]
 pa - descendants of [ mid tone, unmarked]
 pá - pluck [low tone]
 sấ - time, clock [falling tone]

The examples below show how heavy and light vowels compare:
 Ốpí - waist [heavy vowel; high tones] 
 Ópí - chief, king [light vowel; high tones] 
 mvự - drink [heavy vowels; mid tones] 
 mvu - jump, skip, gather [light vowels; mid tones]

Works in Ma'di
Printed material in Ma'di is scarce. The only general published works in Ma'di are missionary publications such as the translation of the New Testament, and prayer and song booklets by the Catholic missionaries. The Ma'di Ethnic and Heritage Welfare Association in Britain publishes a quarterly bilingual (English and Ma'di) paper called Ma'di Lelego.

In the spring of 1998, Radio Uganda began regular broadcasts in Ma'di.

Bibliography 
A'babiku, Rose A Key History of Ma'di
Blackings, M and Fabb N (2003) A Grammar of Ma'di. Mouton
Blackings, M (2011) Ma'di English - English Ma'di Dictionary. Lincom Europa.
Fuli, Severino (2002) Shaping a Free Southern Sudan: Memoirs of our struggle. Loa Parish.

References

Moru-Madi languages